Collet Dobson Collet (31 December 1812 – 28 December 1898) was an English radical freethinker, Chartist and campaigner against newspaper taxation.

Background and work 
Collet was born in London on 31 December 1812, the son of John Dobson (1778–1827), a London merchant, and his wife Elizabeth Barker (1787–1875). His sister was the writer and feminist Sophia Dobson Collet (1822–1894). His brother was the engineer Edward Dobson (1816–1908).

After abandoning a career in the law due to lack of money, Collet became director of music at South Place Chapel and was heavily involved in the Chartist movement. He became Secretary of the People's Charter Union, and of the Newspaper Stamp Abolition Committee (i.e. to overturn the Stamp Act) in 1849. From 1851 - 1870 he was Secretary of the Association for the Repeal of the Taxes on Knowledge.

In 1866 he became editor of The Diplomatic Review. This had been known as The Free Press prior to Collet taking it over and was a mouthpiece for the views of David Urquhart. Collet invited radicals to contribute to the Diplomatic Review and as a result began publishing articles by Karl Marx. The two became great friends and weekly meetings were held at each other's houses at which Shakespeare readings were given by members of their families. These meetings became formalised as the Dogberry Club. Marx's daughter Eleanor and Collet's daughter, Clara Collet, amongst others, became heavily involved in the readings.

His five children included the colonial administrator Wilfred Collet (1856–1929) and the educationalist Clara Collet (1860–1948). He died 1898 in Finsbury, and is buried in Highgate West Cemetery. His wife, Jane Collet (1820–1908), died 10 years after him.

Publications
 Vocal Rudiments. Aus: The Musical Times and Singing Class Circular, 1847. Digitalisat Jstor
 Vocal Rudiments. Part II (Continued). Aus: The Musical Times and Singing Class Circular, 1849. Digitalisat Jstor
 The invasion of France not a war of self-defence. The case against Prussia. Analyses of the "correspondence preliminary to the war". London 1870 (Reprinted from the "Anglo American Times").
 Reasons for the repeal of the railway passenger duty. Paper read in the rooms of the Society of Arts, 26th February, 1877. In: Some words on railway legislation. Waterlow and Sons, London 1877. 
 Life and career of Mr. Richard Moore. With a short sketch of his struggles for political, social and religious freedom. Charles Watt, London 1878.
 Calm is the glassy ocean, translation of the chorus  from Mozart's opera Idomeneo. Novello & Company, London 1891. Digitalisat Internet Archive
 A History of the Taxes on Knowledge their origin and repeal. With an introduction by George Jacob Holyoake. T. Fisher Unwin, London 1899. 2 vols. Digitalisat Internet Archive vol. 1; Digitalisat Internet Archive vol. 2

References
Royle, Edward (1974). Victorian Infidels: the origins of the British Secularist Movement, 1791-1866. Manchester: Manchester University Press.  Online version
 Rudich, Rosie: Zwei Marx-Briefe aus dem Jahre 1876. In: Beiträge zur Geschichte der Arbeiterbewegung. Dietz Verlag, Berlin 1975, Vol. 17, Heft 5, pp. 840–848. Letters 10 November and 9 December 1876 in German and English
 Merson, Allan: The Free Press (1851–1856). In: Beiträge zur Marx-Engels-Forschung 11. Berlin 1982, pp.  137–156. Digitalisat
 McDonald, Deborah. Clara Collet 1860-1948: An Educated Working Woman London 2004

External links

1812 births
1898 deaths
Chartists
Freethought writers
People associated with Conway Hall Ethical Society